The term figure-four may refer to:
Figure-four (grappling hold), a type of grappling hold
Figure-four (climbing technique), a technique employed in technical climbing, particularly ice climbing
A descriptor of a professional wrestling hold; most notably the Figure four leglock
 Figure-four pin, a professional wrestling pin
Figure Four (Battle Angel Alita), a fictional character in the Battle Angel Alita manga series
Figure Four, a Canadian metalcore band